Jaypee University refers to universities belonging to the Jaypee Group and may refer to:

Jaypee University, Anoopshahr
Jaypee Institute of Information Technology, Noida
Jaypee University of Information Technology, Waknaghat
Jaypee University of Engineering and Technology, Guna